The 2021 ASUN women's soccer tournament was the postseason women's soccer tournament for the ASUN Conference held from October 27 through November 4, 2022. The tournament was hosted at campus sites, with the #1 seed hosting two Quarterfinals and one Semifinal while the #2 seed hosted the other two Quarterfinals and Semifinal. The highest remaining seed hosted the final.  The eight-team single-elimination tournament consisted of three rounds based on seeding from regular season conference play. The Lipscomb Bison were the defending tournament champions, and unable to defend their title, losing to Central Arkansas in a penalty-shoot out in the Quarterfinals.  The Florida Gulf Coast Eagles won the tournament after defeating Liberty 4–3 in a penalty shoot-out in the final. It was Florida Gulf Coast's seventh overall title and first since 2017.  All of the Eagle's titles have come under coach Jim Blankenship. As tournament champions, Florida Gulf Coast earned the ASUN's automatic berth into the 2022 NCAA Division I women's soccer tournament.

Seeding 
The top eight teams in the regular season earned a spot in the tournament.  The top seed hosted two of the four Quarterfinals and one Semifinal, while the second seed hosted the other two Quarterfinals and Semifinal.  The highest remaining seed hosted the final.  Two tiebreakers were required to determine seeding for the tournament.  A tiebreaker between Florida Gulf Coast and Lipscomb was required to determine the second and third seeds as both teams finished the regular season with identical 8–1–1 records.  Florida Gulf Coast earned the second seed, and hosting privileges, due to a 2–1 victory over Lipscomb on October 13, 2022.  A tiebreaker between Eastern Kentucky and Central Arkansas was required to determine the fifth and sixth seeds as both teams finished the regular season with identical 4–4–2 conference records.  Eastern Kentucky earned the fifth seed by virtue of their 3–2 regular season win versus Central Arkansas on September 18, 2022.

Bracket
Source:

Schedule

Quarterfinals

Semifinals

Final

Statistics

Goalscorers

All-Tournament team

Source:

MVP in bold

References 

Tournament
ASUN Women's Soccer Tournament